Zhizheng (1341–1370) was the third era name of Toghon Temür, Emperor Shun of Yuan, and was also the Yuan dynasty's final era name. The Yuan dynasty used the era name Zhizheng for a total of 30 years. On 23 May 1370 (Zhizheng 30, 28th day of the 4th month), Biligtü Khan, Emperor Zhaozong of Yuan ascended to the throne and continued to use.

Change of era
 18 January 1341 (Zhiyuan 7, 1st day of 1st month): There was an edict to change the era to Zhizheng.
 23 May 1370 (Zhizheng 30, 28th day of the 4th month): Emperor Huizong died, and Emperor Zhaozong ascended the throne. In May, change the next year to Xuanguang 1 (宣光元年, "the first year of Xuanguang era").

Notes

References

Further reading

Chinese imperial eras